The Starres are Marching Sadly Home (Theinmostlightthirdandfinal) is an EP by the experimental music collective Current 93. It is the final part in the Inmost Light Trilogy, a cycle of three thematically related recordings released in 1995 and 1996. The Starres are Marching Sadly Home is the most experimental of the three, serving as an epilogue to the centerpiece album All the Pretty Little Horses and the introductory EP Where The Long Shadows Fall (Beforetheinmostlight). Like Long Shadows, The Starres is a lengthy, minimal piece with eerie loops and layered vocals; unlike Long Shadows, this piece features full, continuous lyrics. An a capella performance of the traditional song "All the Pretty Little Horses" is performed by Shirley Collins at the finale.

Originally available on compact disc and vinyl, the EP was reissued as part of the boxed set The Inmost Light in 2007. For this release, the title was modified to "The Stars Are Marching Sadly Home…"

Track listing
 "The Starres Are Marching Sadly Home (Theinmostlightthirdandfinal)" - 22:16

Personnel
 David Tibet – vocals, music, lyrics
 Shirley Collins – vocals
 Roxanne Stapleton – vocals
 Andria Degens – vocals
 David Kenny – guitar, engineering
 Steven Stapleton – music, mixing
 Scott Howland - assistant engineering

1996 EPs
Current 93 albums